Stimulator is a genus of gastropods in the family Planorbidae. It consists of one species, Stimulator consetti Iredale, 1944.

References

Planorbidae
Monotypic gastropod genera